Beja may refer to:

Ethnicity
Beja people, an ethnic group in northeast Africa
Blemmyes, historical name for this people in the ancient world
Beja language, language spoken by the Beja people
Beja Congress, a group formed primarily of Beja opposing the government of Sudan

Places
Beja, Portugal, a city in Portugal
Beja District, its district
Beja Airbase, the nearby military airbase
Beja Airport, the nearby civilian airport
Castle of Beja, the castle
Convent of Beja, the former convent, now a museum
Béja, a town in Tunisia
Béja Governorate, the governorate of which it is the capital
, a village in Jaunalūksne Parish, Alūksne Municipality
Beja State, a former princely state of India
Beja, Kapurthala, a village in Punjab State, India

Association football
C.D. Beja, an association football club based in Beja, Portugal
Beja Football Association, which administers lower-tier football in the Beja District
Olympique Béja, an association football club based in the town of Béja, Tunisia

Surname
Fatos Beja, (born 1948), Albanian politician
Oded Beja, Israeli microbiologist
Olinda Beja (born 1946), São Tomé and Príncipe poet and writer
Duke of Beja, a Portuguese noble title

Language and nationality disambiguation pages